Lingg, like its variants Link and Linck, is a German language nickname surname for a left-handed person (from German: link "left", cf. English: leftie, southpaw). It may refer to:

Joshua Michael Lingg (born 1978), American Registered Nurse, graduated with honors in 2005 from the University Of Wisconsin, Snowboarder for the National Ski Patrol and Photographer.
 (born 1964), Austrian photographer
Hermann Lingg (1820–1905), German poet 
Louis Lingg (1864–1887), German-born American anarchist
Louise Lingg (1871–after 1946), German actress, opera singer and screenwriter
Maximilian von Lingg (1842–1930), Roman Catholic bishop of Augsburg
 (1925–2000), Austrian politician

See also 
 Lingg Brewer (born 1944), American politician and educator
 Johann Baptiste Lingg, a 1920 German silent historical film

References 

German-language surnames
Surnames from nicknames